The inauguration of Edgar Lungu as the 6th President of Zambia took place on 13 September 2016. This was the second time Edgar Lungu took the oath after he first took office on 25 January 2015. Edgar Lungu took the oath alongside Inonge Wina as Vice-President of Zambia. The day of the inauguration was set as a public holiday in Zambia and Monday September 12 as a half working day.

Lungu won the controversial August 2016 presidential election, receiving 50.35% of the votes. The election received various criticisms from the opposition party and the opposition petitioned the High court to block the inauguration. However, the high court rejected the application.

Inaugural events

Planning 
The planning of the inauguration of President-elect Edgar Lungu started on the 16th of August but the planning and works were suspended after a presidential petition was filed in an urgent application contesting the validity of President Edgar Lungu’s win by  Hakainde Hichilema, UPND President and his running mate Geoffrey Bwalya Mwamba. On 5 September The Constitutional Court dismissed the petition against the election of President Edgar Lungu by  United Party for National Development  leader Hakainde Hichilema and his running mate Geoffrey Bwalya Mwamba on grounds that its mandate lapsed at 23:59 on Friday. After this the preparations started for the inauguration of president-elect Monday 12 September was set a half working day and Tuesday 13 was a public holiday.

Swearing-in ceremony 
The official swearing-in ceremony took place at the National Heroes Stadium in Lusaka from 0800 hours (UTC) on 13 September 2016. Lungu arrived at the swearing in venue with his wife to a roaring crowd at 0835 (UTC). A priest delivered a prayer to commence the official proceedings. Under the observation of the Chief Justice of Zambia, Irene Mambilima, at 0900 (UTC) Lungu took his oath of office. Lungu then  addressed the nation.

Inauguration speech (excerpt)

Dignitaries in attendance 

President John Magufuli of Tanzania canceled his trip on 11 September 2016 due to the Tanzanian earthquake; Vice President Samia Suluhu attended instead. Yoweri Museveni was also expected to attend the event, however, he went to Somalia instead, for the 28th IGAD Extra ordinary summit.

Government representatives

International organization representatives

References 

Edgar Lungu
2016 in Zambian politics
Edgar Lungu
September 2016 events in Africa
21st century in Lusaka